Holopogon pekinensis is a kind of saprotrophic nutrition orchid. In 2017 it was found in Beijing. It grows under a wooded forest in a ravine at an altitude of 1000m in a mountainous area.

Discovery 
Dr. Mu Xianyun (沐先运) at Beijing Forestry University discovered the rare orchid species in the Yanqing Mountains during a long-term follow-up survey of another rare orchid in Beijing, Cypripedium shanxiense. The new species was officially announced after minor structural analysis, literature inquiries, communication with Russian experts and confirmation by domestic orchid experts.

In 2020, researchers at Beijing Forestry University found it again during a survey of wild plants in the jungle at an altitude of 1,100 meters in the Wulingshan Nature Reserve in Miyun District.

Description 
Plant height 18 to 25 cm, root stem multi-meat, cluster growth. Stem upright, light green, no green leaves; flower sequence green, under the white membrane 2 to 3 pieces, each length 2 to 4 cm, the top piece is sliver-shaped; flower sequence axis length 4 to 8 cm, with 5 to 20 flowers, flower sequence axis is light green soft hair; flower flakes shawl pin-shaped, membrane quality, length 6 to 8 mm back slightly hairy; flower upright, radiation symmetry, green, when flowering the tepals are all expanded; flower stalk length 4 to 8 mm, slim, soft hair; sliver near upright, narrow bar, length 3 to 4 mm, width 1 to 1.2 mm, there is a medium vein, the outer side is slightly hairy; the petals have a distinct middle vein, the lip petals do not crack, 3 to 4 mm long, 0.8 to 1 mm wide; the column is upright, 2 to 3 mm long, the flower wire is short, the anther is nearly egg-shaped, 0.4 to 0.5 mm long, the pollen is oval, the ovary is oval, about 5 mm long, is hairy; florescence is in August, fruit period is in September.

This type of flower features are very primitive, the lip petals are not significantly differentiated, and the petals and slivers are similar, the morphological relative species is Holopogon ussuriensis.

Holopogon is closely related to the genus Neottia, which some scholars believe should be classified as a synonym of Neottia, but studies have also shown that it may be close to the Cephalanthera and should be independent (Chen et al., 2016).

References

Endemic flora of China
Orchids of China
pekinensis